The 1824 Clackmannanshire by-election was held on 13 July 1824 when the incumbent MP  Robert Bruce, who had been holding the seat as "locum" for the Abercrombie family, resigned. It was  won by George Abercromby who was unopposed.

References

1824 elections in Europe
Unopposed by-elections to the Parliament of the United Kingdom in Scottish constituencies
1824 in Scotland
19th century in Clackmannanshire
July 1824 events
1820s elections in Scotland